WRFG (89.3 FM) is a non-commercial public radio station in Atlanta, Georgia. It calls itself Radio Free Georgia and is owned by the Radio Free Georgia Broadcasting Foundation, featuring a community radio format. WRFG airs a variety of musical styles not heard on most Atlanta radio stations, including blues, folk, bluegrass, jazz, R&B, soul and world music. News programs include "Democracy Now!," "Sojourner Truth Radio" and some shows from Pacifica Radio. The station's operations are funded by listener donations, with periodic fundraising drives heard during the year.

Mission
WRFG stated mission is to provide a voice for communities not often served by traditional media. The mission statement, mentioned on air frequently throughout the broadcast day, recognizes "those who continue to be denied free and open access to the broadcast media, and anyone suffering oppression or exploitation based upon class, race, sex, sexual orientation or immigration status."

Programming and format
Since signing on the air for the first time on July 30, 1973, WRFG has filled a void on the Atlanta airwaves. WRFG was the first Atlanta radio station since the 1950s to feature such regional musical forms as blues, bluegrass, and jazz. Reflecting Atlanta's emergence as an "international city," it pioneered programming oriented toward the area's growing Latin, African, Asian and Caribbean communities. WRFG was the first station to carry live broadcasts from the Arts Festival of Atlanta and the Georgia Grassroots Festival.

WRFG produced live broadcasts of speakers at the Hungry Club, Atlanta's weekly interracial forum. It airs the work of local poets, playwrights and authors on a regular basis. WRFG has also initiated programming directed toward Atlanta's neighborhoods, the disabled, Lesbian, Gay, Bisexual, Transgender and Queer (LGBTQ) and other special audiences. Its in-depth coverage of events such as the 1987 rebellion at the Atlanta Federal Penitentiary has received acclaim.

WRFG produced a 50-part documentary "Living Atlanta!" series on Atlanta's history. "Living Atlanta!" won national awards and established a tradition of documentary production at WRFG. In the fall of 1989, the University of Georgia Press published a book based on this award-winning series.

In 1996, WRFG began the World Party Tours broadcasting live from various locations around the world.  The first World Party Tour took WRFG staff and listeners to Jamaica. The same year WRFG went to Dublin, Ireland, to broadcast its St. Patrick's Day Parade. World Party Tour '99 brought the Paint It Jazz Festival in Bridgetown, Barbados, live to WRFG listeners in January of that year.

Program schedule
WRFG's daily schedule includes:
Good Morning Blues
Soul Rhapsody
Progressive News Hour
Global Drumbeat
Public Affairs
Peach State Festival
Jazz to Soothe Your Soul
N I G H T W A T C H
Ruff, Rugged & Raw

Other programs include:
Just Peace is a public affairs program hosted by Heather Gray & Nadia Ali, Ph.D.
Second Opinion explores the connection between profit, politics and the exploitation of animals. The show is hosted by Melody Paris.
Moving the Center with Kali-Ahset Amen offers coverage of topics ranging from racial justice, cultural freedom, and economic development, to folklore, history, arts and science.

Transmitter
In October 1995, WRFG increased its effective radiated power (ERP) to 100,000 watts. On October 23, 2007, the station improved its broadcast coverage area by operating from a new antenna and tower location with 65,000 watts effective radiated power (ERP) at 148 meters (468 feet) in height above average terrain (HAAT). Its transmitter is atop a tower near Emory University, known as the Richland Tower site. It is shared by several FM and TV stations including WANF-TV, WPCH-TV, WATL-TV, WUVG-TV, WWWQ-FM, WZGC-FM, and WKHX-FM.  WRFG's studios and offices are located in the Little Five Points Community Center, east of downtown Atlanta.

See also
List of community radio stations in the United States

References

External links
WRFG official website

RFG
Community radio stations in the United States
Radio stations established in 1973
1973 establishments in Georgia (U.S. state)